The 2002 United States Senate election in Michigan was held on November 5, 2002. Incumbent Democratic U.S. Senator Carl Levin won re-election to a fifth term.

General election

Candidates
 Eric Borregard (Green)
 Doug Dern (Natural Law)
Carl Levin, incumbent U.S. Senator (Democratic)
John Mangopoulos (Reform)
Rocky Raczkowski, State Representative from Farmington Hills (Republican)

Predictions

Results

 
 

|-
| 
| colspan=5 |Democratic hold
|-

See also 
 2002 United States Senate elections

References

Senate
Michigan
2002